Canty House, also known as "The Magnolia," is a historic home located on the campus of West Virginia State University at Institute, Kanawha County, West Virginia.  It was built about 1900, as a simply designed, two-story frame farm house. In 1923, it was remodeled to its present form in the Classical Revival style. It has flanking two-story side galleries and a center pedimented pavilion. It features a two-story portico supported by two Corinthian order columns.  It was originally the home of "Colonel" James M. Canty, one of the early instructors at the West Virginia Colored Institute.

It was listed on the National Register of Historic Places in 1988.

References

African-American history of West Virginia
Neoclassical architecture in West Virginia
Houses completed in 1900
Houses in Kanawha County, West Virginia
Houses on the National Register of Historic Places in West Virginia
National Register of Historic Places in Kanawha County, West Virginia
West Virginia State University
University and college buildings on the National Register of Historic Places in West Virginia